PubMatic, Inc. is a company that develops and implements online advertising software and strategies for the digital publishing and advertising industry. PubMatic's advertising software puts publishers of websites, videos, and mobile apps into contact with ad buyers by using automated systems, while allowing users to opt-out of having their personal information collected on internet searches. PubMatic has a number of offices in countries around the world.

History
PubMatic was founded in 2006 by Rajeev and Amar Goel with Anand Das and Mukul Kumar.  The PubMatic software was developed in Pune, India.

In 2011 the company hired Steve Pantelick as CFO, and in 2012 PubMatic raised $45 million from investors.

In 2014 PubMatic acquired mobile ad server Mocean Mobile, formerly knows as Mojiva, for $15.5 million.

In 2015, PubMatic opened an office in Latin America.

By 2016, the firm was operating by storing most of its data on OpenStack private cloud servers.

In January 2020, PubMatic launched an Identity Hub integrating identity partner IDs, including IAB DigiTrust, The Trade Desk Unified ID, ID5, and LiveIntent.

In February 2020, PubMatic released the OpenWrap SDK to enhance header bidding options for mobile publishers.

In November 2020, PubMatic filed for an IPO in Nasdaq.

Activities
PubMatic, for a fee, participates in online auctions to help advertisers buy and publishers sell media and advertising spots between various advertising companies. The company also produces quarterly reports about advertising prices.

References

External links
Official Website
Famium Website

Marketing companies established in 2006
Indian companies established in 2006
Digital marketing companies of India
Online advertising services and affiliate networks
2020 initial public offerings
Companies listed on the Nasdaq